Sir Michael Francis Bonallack, OBE (born 31 December 1934) is an English amateur golfer who was one of the leading administrators in world golf in the late 20th century.

Bonallack was born in Chigwell, Essex. He learned the game of golf under the tutelage of head professional Bert Hodson at Chigwell and soon won the Boys Amateur Championship in 1952. A rare example of an outstanding golfer who remained an amateur in the era when professional domination of the sport became firmly entrenched, he went on to win the Amateur Championship and the English Amateur five times each and the Brabazon Trophy four times. He was a member of nine Walker Cup teams and played in the Eisenhower Trophy seven times. His best finish at the Open Championship was eleventh in 1959. He was the leading amateur at the Open in 1968 and 1971.

Affiliations
He was Secretary of The Royal and Ancient Golf Club of St Andrews from 1983 to 1999 and Captain from 1999 to 2000. He has also been President of the Golf Club Managers' Association (1974–84), Chairman of the PGA of Great Britain and Ireland (1976–81), Chairman of the Golf Foundation (1977–82), and President of the English Golf Union (1982).

He is the current President of the British and International Golf Greenkeepers Association (BIGGA) and also served as President of the One Armed Golfers Society, the Professional Golfers Association of Europe and as Chairman of the advisory committee for the Official World Golf Rankings. He is also President of the National Association of Public and Proprietary Golf Courses (NAPGC).

Honours
Bonallack received an OBE for services to golf in 1971, and was created a Knight Bachelor in 1998. In 1972, he was voted the Bob Jones Award, the highest honour given by the United States Golf Association in recognition of distinguished sportsmanship in golf. He is a member of Augusta National Golf Club, and has received numerous honours from golfing organisations around the world, culminating in his induction into the World Golf Hall of Fame in 2000.

Legacy
Europe and the Asia-Pacific play for the Sir Michael Bonallack Trophy every two years. The teams consist of 12 amateur golfers and no more than two players can be from the same country.

Personal life
Bonallack married Angela Ward in February 1958.

Tournament wins (30)
Note: This list may be incomplete
1952 Boys Amateur Championship
1957 Berkshire Trophy
1959 Sunningdale Foursomes (with Doug Sewell)
1961 The Amateur Championship, Berkshire Trophy, Golf Illustrated Gold Vase (tie with David Harrison)
1962 English Amateur
1963 English Amateur
1964 Brabazon Trophy
1965 The Amateur Championship, English Amateur, Lytham Trophy (tie with Clive Clark), Berkshire Trophy
1967 English Amateur, Golf Illustrated Gold Vase (tie with Bob Durrant lost playoff for Gold Medal)
1968 The Amateur Championship, English Amateur, Brabazon Trophy, Berkshire Trophy, Golf Illustrated Gold Vase
1969 The Amateur Championship, Brabazon Trophy (tie with Rodney Foster), Golf Illustrated Gold Vase
1970 The Amateur Championship, Berkshire Trophy
1971 Brabazon Trophy, Berkshire Trophy (tie with John Davies), Golf Illustrated Gold Vase
1972 Lytham Trophy
1975 Golf Illustrated Gold Vase

Results in major championships

Note: Bonallack did not play in the U.S. Open or the PGA Championship.

LA = Low amateur
CUT = missed the half-way cut (3rd round cut in 1970 Open Championship)
"T" indicates a tie for a place
R256, R128, R64, R32, R16, QF, SF = Round in which player lost in match play
Green background for wins. Yellow background for top-10

Sources: Masters, U.S. Open and U.S. Amateur, Open Championship, Amateur Championship (1956, 1957, 1958, 1959, 1960)

Awards and achievements
 1968 British Association of Golf Writers award
 1971 Officer of the Order of the British Empire
 1972 United States Golf Association Bob Jones Award
 1991 American Society of Golf Course Architects Donald Ross award
 1998 Knight Bachelor
 1999 Spanish Golf Federation Golf Medal of Honour
 2000 Czech Republic Golf Shield of Honour
 2000 Metropolitan Golf Association Lifetime Service Award
 2000 Inducted into World Golf Hall of Fame

Team appearances
this list may be incomplete
Eisenhower Trophy (representing Great Britain and Ireland): 1960, 1962, 1964 (winners), 1966, 1968 (individual leader, tie), 1970, 1972
Walker Cup (representing Great Britain and Ireland): 1957, 1959, 1961, 1963, 1965 (tied), 1967, 1969 (playing captain), 1971 (winners, playing captain), 1973
Amateurs–Professionals Match (representing the Amateurs): 1957, 1958 (winners), 1959, 1960
St Andrews Trophy (representing Great Britain and Ireland): 1958 (winners), 1960 (winners), 1962 (winners), 1964 (winners), 1966 (winners), 1968 (winners), 1970 (winners), 1972 (winners)
Commonwealth Tournament (representing Great Britain): 1959, 1963 (joint winners), 1967 (joint winners), 1971
European Amateur Team Championship (representing England): 1963 (winners), 1965, 1969 (winners), 1971 (winners)

References

External links

Gazette of knighthood

English male golfers
Amateur golfers
Golf administrators
World Golf Hall of Fame inductees
Knights Bachelor
People in sports awarded knighthoods
People from Chigwell
1934 births
Living people